Cities and towns under the oblast's jurisdiction:
Tula (Тула) (administrative center)
City districts:
Privokzalny (Привокзальный)
Proletarsky (Пролетарский)
Sovetsky (Советский)
Tsentralny (Центральный)
Zarechensky (Зареченский)
Donskoy (Донской)
Shchyokino (Щёкино)
Urban-type settlements under the town's jurisdiction:
Pervomaysky (Первомайский)
Districts:
Aleksinsky (Алексинский)
Towns under the district's jurisdiction:
Aleksin (Алексин)
Urban-type settlements under the district's jurisdiction:
Novogurovsky (Новогуровский)
with 13 rural okrugs under the district's jurisdiction.
Arsenyevsky (Арсеньевский)
Urban-type settlements under the district's jurisdiction:
Arsenyevo (Арсеньево)
Slavny (Славный)
with 13 rural okrugs under the district's jurisdiction.
Belyovsky (Белёвский)
Towns under the district's jurisdiction:
Belyov (Белёв)
with 16 rural okrugs under the district's jurisdiction.
Bogoroditsky (Богородицкий)
Towns under the district's jurisdiction:
Bogoroditsk (Богородицк)
with 14 rural okrugs under the district's jurisdiction.
Chernsky (Чернский)
Urban-type settlements under the district's jurisdiction:
Chern (Чернь)
with 24 rural administrations under the district's jurisdiction.
Dubensky (Дубенский)
Urban-type settlements under the district's jurisdiction:
Dubna (Дубна)
with 7 rural okrugs under the district's jurisdiction.
Kamensky (Каменский)
with 10 rural okrugs under the district's jurisdiction.
Kimovsky (Кимовский)
Towns under the district's jurisdiction:
Kimovsk (Кимовск)
with 19 rural okrugs under the district's jurisdiction.
Kireyevsky (Киреевский)
Towns under the district's jurisdiction:
Bolokhovo (Болохово)
Kireyevsk (Киреевск)
Lipki (Липки)
with 12 rural okrugs under the district's jurisdiction.
Kurkinsky (Куркинский)
Urban-type settlements under the district's jurisdiction:
Kurkino (Куркино)
with 8 volosts under the district's jurisdiction.
Leninsky (Ленинский)
with 17 rural okrugs under the district's jurisdiction.
Novomoskovsky (Новомосковский)
Towns under the district's jurisdiction:
Novomoskovsk (Новомосковск)
Sokolniki (Сокольники)
with 13 rural okrugs under the district's jurisdiction.
Odoyevsky (Одоевский)
Urban-type settlements under the district's jurisdiction:
Odoyev (Одоев)
with 12 rural administrations under the district's jurisdiction.
Plavsky (Плавский)
Towns under the district's jurisdiction:
Plavsk (Плавск)
with 13 rural okrugs under the district's jurisdiction.
Shchyokinsky (Щёкинский)
Towns under the district's jurisdiction:
Sovetsk (Советск)
with 21 rural administrations under the district's jurisdiction.
Suvorovsky (Суворовский)
Towns under the district's jurisdiction:
Chekalin (Чекалин)
Suvorov (Суворов)
with 17 rural territories under the district's jurisdiction.
Tyoplo-Ogaryovsky (Тёпло-Огарёвский)
Urban-type settlements under the district's jurisdiction:
Tyoploye (Тёплое)
with 18 rural okrugs under the district's jurisdiction.
Uzlovsky (Узловский)
Towns under the district's jurisdiction:
Uzlovaya (Узловая)
with 17 rural administrations under the district's jurisdiction.
Venyovsky (Венёвский)
Towns under the district's jurisdiction:
Venyov (Венёв)
with 19 rural okrugs under the district's jurisdiction.
Volovsky (Воловский)
Urban-type settlements under the district's jurisdiction:
Volovo (Волово)
with 13 rural okrugs under the district's jurisdiction.
Yasnogorsky (Ясногорский)
Towns under the district's jurisdiction:
Yasnogorsk (Ясногорск)
with 19 rural territories under the district's jurisdiction.
Yefremovsky (Ефремовский)
Towns under the district's jurisdiction:
Yefremov (Ефремов)
with 24 rural okrugs under the district's jurisdiction.
Zaoksky (Заокский)
Urban-type settlements under the district's jurisdiction:
Zaoksky (Заокский)
with 12 rural okrugs under the district's jurisdiction.

References

Tula Oblast
Tula Oblast